The 2004–05 season was Stade Brestois 29's 55th season in existence and the club's first season back in the second division of French football. In addition to the domestic league, Brest participated in this season's editions of the Coupe de France, and the Coupe de la Ligue.

Competitions

Overall record

Ligue 2

League table

Results summary

Results by round

Matches

Coupe de France

Coupe de la Ligue

References

Brest
Stade Brestois 29 seasons